Jerome Boylan (born 19 June 1999) is an Irish hurler who plays for Limerick Senior Championship club Na Piarsaigh and at inter-county level with the Limerick senior hurling team.

Career statistics

Honours

Ardscoil Rís
Dr Harty Cup (2): 2016, 2018

Na Piarsaigh
Munster Senior Club Hurling Championship (1): 2017
Limerick Senior Hurling Championship (2): 2017, 2020

Limerick
All-Ireland Senior Hurling Championship (1): 2020
Munster Senior Hurling Championship (1): 2020
National Hurling League (1): 2020

References

External link

 Jerome Boylan profile at the Na Piarsaigh GAA site

1999 births
Living people
Limerick inter-county hurlers
Na Piarsaigh (Limerick) hurlers